Desktop video refers to a phenomenon lasting from the mid-1980s to the early 1990s when the graphics capabilities of personal computers such as Commodore's Amiga, the Apple Macintosh II and specially-upgraded IBM PC compatibles had advanced to the point where individuals and local broadcasters could use them for analog non-linear editing (NLE) and vision mixing in video production. Despite the use of computers, desktop video should not be confused with digital video since the video data remained analog. Full-screen, full-motion video's vast storage requirements meant that the promise of digital encoding would not be realized on desktop computers for at least another decade.

Description
There were multiple models of genlock cards available to synchronise the content; the Newtek Video Toaster was commonly used in Amiga and PC systems, while Mac systems had the SuperMac Video Spigot and Radius VideoVision cards. Apple later introduced the Macintosh Quadra 840AV and Centris 660AV systems to specifically address this market.

Desktop video was a parallel development to desktop publishing and enabled many small production houses and local TV stations to produce their own original content for the first time. Along with the advent of public access cable channels, desktop video meant that television advertising became affordable for local businesses such as retailers, restaurants, real estate agents, contractors and auto dealers for the first time. As with the phrase desktop publishing, use of the term died out as the technologies to which it referred become the norm for any kind of video production.

Broadcasting
Home video
Film and video terminology
Film and video technology
Multimedia